The 2014 Paris–Nice was the 72nd running of the Paris–Nice cycling stage race, often known as the Race to the Sun, and the first European World Tour event of the season. It started on 9 March in Mantes-la-Jolie and ended on 16 March in Nice and consisted of eight stages. It was the second race of the 2014 UCI World Tour season. The race took on an unusual profile in 2014 in that it did not feature a time trial of any description and did not have any stages with a summit finish. The intention was to make the race more open and encourage attacking racing rather than a defensive race ruled by time trial experts or the climbing specialists.

Betancur won the general classification by 14 seconds over runner-up Rui Costa of the  squad, while 's Arthur Vichot completed the podium – 6 seconds behind Costa and 20 seconds down on Betancur – after he was victorious on the final stage, picking up enough bonus seconds to move up the classification.

In the race's other classifications, 's John Degenkolb was the winner of the green jersey for the points classification, amassing the highest number of points during stages at intermediate sprints and stage finishes, and Pim Ligthart was the winner of the mountains classification for the  team. Betancur also won the white jersey for the young rider classification, as he was the highest placed rider born in 1989 or later, while the  won the team classification.

Schedule

Teams
As Paris–Nice was a UCI World Tour event, all 18 UCI ProTeams were invited automatically and obligated to send a squad. Three other squads were given wildcard places, and as such, formed the event's 21-team peloton.

The 21 teams that competed in the race were:

Stages

Stage 1
9 March 2014 — Mantes-la-Jolie to Mantes-la-Jolie,

Stage 2
10 March 2014 — Rambouillet to Saint-Georges-sur-Baulche,

Stage 3
11 March 2014 — Toucy to Circuit de Nevers Magny-Cours,

Stage 4
12 March 2014 — Nevers to Belleville,

Stage 5
13 March 2014 — Crêches-sur-Saône to Rive-de-Gier,

Stage 6
14 March 2014 — Saint-Saturnin-lès-Avignon to Fayence,

Stage 7
15 March 2014 — Mougins to Biot–Sophia Antipolis,

Stage 8
16 March 2014 — Nice to Nice,

Classification leadership table

Notes
 In stage 2, Gianni Meersman, who was second in the points classification, wore the green jersey, because Nacer Bouhanni (in first place) wore the yellow jersey as leader of the general classification during that stage. Similarly, John Degenkolb, who was second in the young rider classification, wore the white jersey, as Bouhanni also led that classification.
 In stage 3, John Degenkolb, who was second in the points classification, wore the green jersey, because Nacer Bouhanni (in first place) wore the yellow jersey as leader of the general classification during that stage. Similarly, Moreno Hofland, who was third in the young rider classification, wore the white jersey, due to Bouhanni and Degenkolb (who was also second in the young rider classification) wearing other jerseys.

References

External links

Paris–Nice
Paris-Nice
Paris-Nice
Paris-Nice